Leisure Panic! is a solo album by Australian rock musician, Dan Kelly. It was released in October 2015 through ABC Music/Universal Music Australia. Kelly recorded it over two years in East London, Northern New South Wales, Melbourne and Sydney with members of the Dan Kelly Dream Band. It was produced by Kelly and, long-term collaborator, Aaron Cupples.

Leisure Panic! peaked at No. 10 on the ARIA Hitseekers Albums Chart. It provided two singles, "Never Stop the Rot" (2015) and "Everything's Amazing" (2016). The album was met with critical acclaim, culminating in its nomination for the 2015 AMP award for best Australian album.

Track listing

All lyrics and music composed by Dan Kelly, except where noted.

 "On the Run (Part 2)" 
 "Hydra Ferry"
 "Haters"
 "Creme de la Creme de la Creme"
 "Never Stop the Rot" 
 "National Park and Wildlife"
 "Baby Bonus"
 "Melbourne vs Sydney"
 "Gold Coast Man"
 "Ex Bandido"
 "Everything's Amazing" 
 "Jet Lag"

Personnel

Dan Kelly Dream Band
 Dan Kelly – vocals, electric and acoustic guitars, percussion, piano, occasional bass, drum machine, wurlitzer, synthesizer
 Indra Adams – bass
 Dave Williams – drums, congas
 Madeleine Kelly and Memphis Kelly – backing vocals
 Aaron Cupples – bass, drum programming, glockenspiel
 Joe Cope – Farfisa organ, Mellotron, keyboards

Additional musicians
 Dale Packard – synthesizer, saxophone
 Ryan Nelson – guitar
 Adam Affif – double bass
 Bree Van Reyk – kick drum and party noises

References

2015 albums
Dan Kelly (musician) albums